The 171st Special Operations Aviation Squadron (171 SOAS) is an Australian Army helicopter squadron equipped with NHIndustries MRH-90 Taipan helicopters and provides support to the Special Operations Command. The squadron is based at Luscombe Airfield, Holsworthy Barracks, Sydney and forms part of the 6th Aviation Regiment as the regiment's sole operational squadron. In December 2021, the squadron completed its transition from the retiring Sikorsky S70A Black Hawk helicopter to the MRH-90 Taipan helicopter.

Overview
The squadron primarily supports the Tactical Assault Group, troop lift support is also provided to other Special Forces based at Holsworthy and Perth, and to other east coast and southern Australian based units.

In March 1997, the Board of Inquiry into the Black Hawk Training Accident in June 1996 recommended that dedicated Army aviation assets be allocated in support of the counter terrorist and special operations capability and that the units be collocated during training, planning and the conduct of operations.

History
The 171st Special Operations Aviation Squadron traces its lineage back to the 161st Reconnaissance Flight which was formed in June 1965 based at RAAF Base Amberley. The Flight was part of the 16th Army Light Aircraft Squadron which in 1967 became the 1st Aviation Regiment. The Flight served in Vietnam from 1965 to 1971 and during this period was renamed the 161st (Independent) Reconnaissance Flight. On return from Vietnam, the Flight was based at Oakey. On 31 January 1974, the Flight was re-designated as the "171st Operational Support Squadron" following a restructure of the 1st Aviation Regiment using the number from the disbanded 171st Air Cavalry Flight.

On 19 December 2002, the Prime Minister announced the creation of the Special Operations Command and that the government would accelerate the purchase of the MRH-90 Taipan helicopters to enable a squadron of helicopters to be based in Sydney as a potent addition to the Tactical Assault Group East.

On 28 November 2004, 'A' Squadron of the 5th Aviation Regiment based at RAAF Base Townsville swapped designations with the 171st Operational Support Squadron. The squadron was equipped with the Sikorsky S-70A Black Hawk with the role of providing support to the Special Operations Command.

The squadron separated from the 1st Aviation Regiment and was placed under the command of the 16th Aviation Brigade as an independent squadron and was re-designated as the "171st Aviation Squadron". The squadron was commanded by a lieutenant colonel in addition to the conventional squadron commander of Major rank.

In July 2005, Holsworthy Barracks was selected as the location in Sydney to relocate the squadron. In December 2006, the squadron relocated to temporary facilities at Luscombe Airfield with the redevelopment of the airfield expected to be completed by late 2008.

The squadron was involved in operations in East Timor as part of Operation Astute. On 29 November 2006, a Squadron Black Hawk helicopter crashed during Operation Quickstep while attached to HMAS Kanimbla off the coast of Fiji. The helicopter's pilot, Captain Mark Bingley, and Trooper Joshua Porter from the Special Air Service Regiment were killed in the crash.

In March 2008, the squadron became part of the newly raised 6th Aviation Regiment following implementation of a recommendation from the Board of Inquiry into the Crash of Black Hawk 221 to raise a regiment.

The squadron has been renamed the "171st Special Operations Aviation Squadron"; it has had a new name from at least January 2020.

Current aircraft

The squadron is equipped with the MRH 90 Taipan, an Australian variant of the NHI NH90, and fully transitioned from the S-70A-9 Black Hawk in December 2021. The squadron was originally planned to have transitioned to the MRH 90 Taipan from the Black Hawk by December 2013 when the Black Hawk was scheduled to be retired from service. However, the MRH 90 Program encountered significant problems, and in particular, the NH90 had not been operated in a dedicated special operations role, delaying the withdrawal in order to develop a special operations capable MRH90. The Chief of Army extended the service of 20 Black Hawks to 2022 with 18 based at Holsworthy and two retained at the Oakey Army Aviation Centre in Queensland.

In February 2019, under Plan Palisade the first two of 12 MRH90 helicopters were delivered to the 6th Aviation Regiment. This required developing a Fast Roping and Rappelling Extraction System (FRRES) and a gun mount for the cabin door. The Taipan Gun Mount can fit either a M134D minigun or MAG 58 machine gun and when not in use can be moved into a outward stowed position to provide clearance to enable fast roping and rappelling. 

In 2016, the government in the Defence White Paper 2016 announced a plan to acquire up to 18 light helicopters under Project Land 2097 Phase 4 for the 6th Aviation Regiment to operate in dense urban environments with deliveries expected to commence in 2022-2023.

In December 2021, the government announced it plans to retire the Army's fleet of MRH90 Taipan helicopters earlier than scheduled to be replaced by UH-60M Black Hawk helicopters.

See also
 British Joint Special Forces Aviation Wing
 Canadian 427 Special Operations Aviation Squadron
 French 4th Special Forces Helicopter Regiment
 Italian 3rd Special Operations Helicopter Regiment
 U.S. 160th Special Operations Aviation Regiment – Night Stalkers

References

Further reading

 

171
171
Military units and formations established in 1968
1968 establishments in Australia
Helicopter units and formations
Cold War history of Australia